Goher Mumtaz is a Pakistani musician, singer-songwriter, music composer, guitarist and actor. He is famous for being the founding member of rock band Jal.

Early life
Goher was born in Lahore. As a child, Goher practiced music on a keyboard which he got as a gift. At 16, he sold his bike to buy his first guitar which he hid under his bed due to parent's restrictions.

After his high school exams, Goher suffered an accident and was confined to bed for six months. This gave him time and space to grasp every note in the music that he listened to. With no formal training, Goher taught himself composition, song writing and singing. Later, he won in many college-level music competitions and gained momentum by performing at local restaurants in Lahore. He was inspired by Pakistani Bands Junoon and Vital Signs, and wanted to form a band of his own like them.

Personal life
Since 2016 he's married to Anum Ahmed, who made her acting debut with him in the 2016 Hum TV drama Kathputli, and who's interested in filmmaking as well.

Formation of Jal 
Goher and Atif Aslam were college fellows and they used to sing in college concerts. They thought to form a band and released their first song "Aadat" on the Internet. The song was written and composed by Goher and sung by Atif. By the time the song was released it became a major hit in the subcontinent and all radio and TV stations started playing that song.

After the major hit, "Aadat", Goher &andAtif started getting concert queries, they then decided to give a proper name to their band, so they named it Jal (water in Urdu) and performed in various concerts with this name and line-up of Goher on ugitars and Atif on vocals.

Later on Atif, left the band because of some differences and he pursued his solo career, while Goher formed the new line-up and brought Farhan Saeed on vocals and Amir Sheraz (Shazi) on bass. With this new line-up Jal released their first studio album Aadat in 2003. The album was a major hit in both Pakistan and India and won various awards. With the same line-up, Jal released Boondh in 2007, and again it was a major hit and the band won many awards. They performed in numerous concerts with the same line-up. Jal also performed two songs in Coke Studio (Pakistan) in season 4.

In 2011, Farhan Saeed left the band because of some personal differences. Therefore, Goher took the position of lead vocalist and brought Saad Sultan on lead guitar .

Jal released album Pyass worldwide in 2013 and performed in many concerts with this line-up. The album was nominated as best album of the year in Hum Awards and Lux Style Awards.

Brand ambassador of Gibson Guitar 
Goher Mumtaz became the first brand ambassador of Gibson Guitar Corporation in the subcontinent. It was a unique achievement and he gained it because of his exceptional guitar skills and composition of melodies which changed the course of pop music in the subcontinent.

Goher Mumtaz as lead vocalist of Jal 

After the departure of Farhan Saeed Goher took the charge of vocalist of his band, in the beginning he faced criticism regarding his vocal abilities but after performing in various concerts with more than 20 songs in each concert, Mumtaz proved himself fully capable of taking charge of his band as lead singer. Jal's third studio album was released and all the songs were sung by Goher himself except one song, "Dil Ki Baat", which was sung by Shazi.

Later on he released many singles in his own voice and mesmerized his fans with his voice. "Tery Baajon", "Laiyan Laiyan" and "Ooncha" were super hit songs in Goher`s own voice. His fans used to like him as lyricist, composer and guitarist but after these songs they started liking him as singer as well.

Acting career 

Due to his looks and performances in music videos Goher was approached by many directors and was offered many roles of TV Dramas. Initially, he rejected all the offers as he wanted to give his full attention to music only but after so many requests he signed his first drama Kountry Love starring Mawra Hocane, Urwa Hocane and other various artists of Pakistani drama industry.

After receiving overwhelming response Goher took his acting career seriously and signed another serial Tanhai for Hum TV.

After that he has been acting in dramas which are being aired on Geo TV, Hum TV, and ARY Digital. The roles played by him got much fame in social media specially the character Sameer who was a music teacher in drama serial Uff Yeh Mohabbat and his negative character of Adil in Ghayal.

In 2017, Goher signed another TV serial called Faisala along with Sonia Mishal, which aired on ARY Digital. He is playing the lead role of a very nice guy Asad in this drama. Goher has alson written, composed and sung OST of the song which is named with serial title that is "Faisla".

Patriotic songs 
Goher has immense love for his country Pakistan and that love can easily be seen from the number of songs he has dedicated to his country and Pakistan Armed Forces. He dedicated his song "Tu Qadam Berhaye Ja" to the victims of the Army Public School massacre and armed forces of Pakistan. He also released a song "Ooncha", which was dedicated to Pakistan Air Force. Earlier, Jal had released a song "Ye Mera Pakistan", which was another patriotic song.

Big screen debut 
Goher Mumtaz amazed his fans in his guest appearance in Pakistani film Lahore Se Aagey along with Ali Zafar. Though it was only a guest appearance but also it was first ever film appearance. The main cast of film includes Saba Qamar and Yasir Hussain.

Discography

Albums

Singles

Coke Studio Pakistan

Pakistani drama soundtracks

Filmography

Film

Television

See also 
 Jal (band)
 Farhan Saeed
 Atif Aslam

References

External links
 
 

Pakistani musicians
Living people
Pakistani guitarists
Pakistani rock guitarists
1981 births